The Coronavirus Tech Handbook is a website designed to crowdsource information about the SARS-CoV-2 coronavirus. It was developed at Newspeak House, a hackerspace for politics in London, England.

The site, which launched in March 2020, is hosted as an interlinked collection of user-editable online documents, which makes it effectively a wiki. As of October 2020 it has expanded to provide tools for consumers, businesses, local governments, and developers, amongst others, to help combat the COVID-19 pandemic.

Its stated aim is to provide:

References

Websites about the COVID-19 pandemic
Medical websites
Open data
Internet properties established in 2020
Wikis
COVID-19 pandemic in the United Kingdom